The Annamayya Urban Development Authority (AUDA) is an urban planning agency in Kadapa district of the Indian state of Andhra Pradesh. It was constituted on 1 January 2019, under Andhra Pradesh Metropolitan Region and Urban Development Authority Act, 2016 with the headquarters located at Kadapa.

Jurisdiction 
It covers 520 villages in 41 mandals of Kadapa district. The below table lists the urban areas of AUDA.

References 

Kadapa district
Urban development authorities of Andhra Pradesh
State urban development authorities of India